Saint Sophrony (23 September 1896, in Moscow – 11 July 1993, in Tolleshunt Knights), known also as Elder Sophrony or Father Sophrony was an archimandrite and one of the noted ascetic Christian monks of the twentieth century. He is best known as the disciple and biographer of St Silouan the Athonite and compiler of St Silouan's works, and as the founder of the Patriarchal Stavropegic Monastery of St. John the Baptist in Tolleshunt Knights, Maldon, Essex, England.

He was canonised by the Ecumenical Patriarchate of Constantinople on 27 November 2019.

Timeline

Early life
On September 23, 1896, Sergei Symeonovich Sakharov was born to Orthodox parents in Russia. He grew up in a large Orthodox family with four brothers and four sisters. As a young child, he assimilated the spirit of prayer from his nanny, who would take him with her to church and he would pray for up to three quarters of an hour at a time.  Even as a child, Sergei claimed to have experienced the Uncreated Light, which he later described as the Christ-God manifesting as a light, which defies notions of place and volume. He read widely, including such Russian greats as Gogol, Turgenev, Tolstoy, Dostoyevsky and Pushkin.

Due to great artistic talent,  Sakharov studied at the Academy of Arts between 1915 and 1917, and then at the Moscow School of Painting, Sculpture and Architecture between 1920 and 1921.  He used art as a "quasi-mystical" means "to discover eternal beauty", "breaking through present reality ... into new horizons of being".  Later, this would help him to differentiate between human intellectual light and God's Uncreated Light.

It was around the time of his study at the Moscow School that Sakharov would see Christianity's focus on personal love as being necessarily finite; he fell away from the Orthodoxy of his youth and delved into Indian mystical religions based on the impersonal Absolute.

In 1921 Sakharov left Russia: partly to continue his artistic career in Western Europe, and partly because he was not a Marxist.  After first going to Italy, he went to Berlin, and then settled in Paris in 1922.

Paris
In 1922 Sakharov arrived in Paris where his artistic exhibitions attracted the attention of the French media. He was frustrated by the inability of art to express purity. He saw rational knowledge as unable to provide answer to the biggest question, the problem of death. In 1924 due to his realisation that Christ's precept to love God totally was not psychological but ontological, and the only way to relate to God, and the necessity of love being personal, Sakharov returned to Christianity on Great Saturday. He experienced Uncreated Light (in a strength unmatched to the end of his life) and as a result distanced himself from his art. The St. Sergius Orthodox Theological Institute began with Sakharov among its first students.  Here he was lectured by Fr Sergius Bulgakov and Nicholas Berdyaev; however, while both influenced him, problems with each (sophiology and anti-asceticism, respectively), meant that their influence on him was limited. In 1925, finding formal theological study to be unfulfilling, Sakharov left the Institute and Paris for Mount Athos.

Mt Athos

In 1926 Sakharov arrived at Mt Athos, entering the Monastery of St Panteleimon, desiring to learn how to pray and have the right attitude toward God. In 1930 he was ordained to the diaconate by St Nicolai (Velimirovic) of Zicha.  He became a disciple of St Silouan the Athonite, Fr Sophrony's greatest influence. While St Silouan had no formal system of theology, his living of theology taught Fr Sophrony volumes, which Fr Sophrony would later systematise. From 1932 to 1946, Fr Sophrony exchanged letters with Fr David Balfour, a Catholic who converted to Orthodoxy. These letters reveal Fr Sophrony's knowledge of many Fathers of the Church, and forced Fr Sophrony to articulate his theological thought, and to demonstrate the differences between Western and Eastern thought.  Many of Fr Sophrony's later thoughts would arise out of the same topics addressed in this correspondence. One of Sophrony's critics was Fr. Georges Florovsky, who attacked his concept of "Theological Confession" through his critique of Lossky's understanding of antinomy as the criterion of piety. Sophrony was influenced by the latter in this specific theology.

In 1938 St Silouan reposed (September 24). Following St Silouan's instructions, Elder Sophrony left the monastery grounds to reside in the Athonite desert: first at Karoulia, then at a cave near St Paul's Monastery. World War II was a time of such intense prayer that Fr Sophrony's health was affected, teaching him the interdependence of all mankind. In 1941 Fr Sophrony was ordained to the priesthood, and became a spiritual father to many Athonite monks.

Paris revisited
In 1947, circumstances (possibly to publish St Silouan's works, possibly to complete his theological education, possibly due to deteriorating health, possibly due to difficulties of being non-Greek after WW2) forced Elder Sophrony to move to Paris.  Balfour helped him gain a passport. Here the faculty of St Sergius allowed Elder Sophrony to sit the examinations of the whole course, providing for his needs; however, upon arrival, this was blocked by faculty insistence on Elder Sophrony denying by silence the grace of the Moscow Patriarchate, which he refused to do. Sophrony settled in Russian House, an old-age home, in St Genevieve-des-Bois, assisting the priest and acting as father confessor. He had a major operation on a stomach ulcer.

In 1948, Elder Sophrony produced the first mimeographed edition of Staretz Silouan on a hand-roneo.  In it, Elder Sophrony outlined St Silouan's principles of theology, and explained many fundamental concepts (prayer for the whole world, God-forsakenness and the idea of all humanity being connected). In 1950 Elder Sophrony worked with Vladimir Lossky on the Messager de l'Exarchat du Patriarche Russe en Europe Occidentale until 1957.  Lossky influenced Elder Sophrony's thoughts on many contemporary issues and complimented Elder Sophrony's work on Trinitarian thought and its application to the Church and humanity; however, Lossky would not talk about a deified human nature, nor about the idea of God-forsakenness in a positive view, as Elder Sophrony did.

In 1952, Elder Sophrony produced a professional second edition of Staretz Silouan.  This book brought much fame to both St Silouan and Elder Sophrony, and included a theological introduction to St Silouan's works, based on Lossky finding no theological value in the Saint's works.

Essex, England
By 1958 Sophrony had many people living near him and seeking the monastic life.  A property at Tolleshunt Knights, Maldon, Essex, England was inspected. In 1959 the Community of St John the Baptist was formed at Tolleshunt Knights under Metropolitan Anthony (Bloom) of Sourozh.  The monastery has both monks and nuns, and numbers six. In 1965 the  Monastery of St John the Baptist, with the blessing of Patriarch Alexy, moved under the Ecumenical Patriarchate's omophorion.  Later, the Ecumenical Patriarchate would upgrade the Monastery to Stavropegic.

1973 saw the publication of a more complete translation of Monk of Mt Athos (the life of St Silouan), while in 1975 Wisdom of Mt Athos (the writings of St Silouan) was published. In 1977 His Life is Mine is published. We Shall See Him As He Is was published in 1985  to mixed reviews: readers in the West generally enjoyed the book, while the Russians generally criticised the book.  Some criticism was so stinging that it, along with illness, discouraged Elder Sophrony from writing again.

Events of and after his death
The monastery had been informed that the only way that it could bury people on its property was to build an underground crypt, which it proceeded to build; Elder Sophrony said that he would not die until the crypt was ready. Then, having been told of the expected completion date of 12 July 1993, Elder Sophrony stated that he "would be ready". On 11 July 1993, Elder Sophrony died, and his funeral and burial, on the 14th, were attended by monastics from around the world. At the time of Fr Sophrony's death, there were 25 monastics in the monastery, a number that has grown since then.

Mother Elizabeth, the eldest nun, died soon after, on the 24th. This was in accordance with Elder Sophrony's words: that he would die first, and she would die soon after.

On Prayer, a book containing Elder Sophrony's writings on prayer - particularly the Jesus Prayer - was published posthumously. A comprehensive look at Sophrony's theology was later published by his great-nephew Nicholas Sakharov. This writer cited Sophrony's influence on a number of Russian thinkers, particularly his philosophy of "the knowing heart", which was contrasted to the "self-aware thinking mind in Hegel".

On November 27, 2019, the Ecumenical Patriarchate announced the glorification of Elder Sophrony as a saint of the Orthodox Church.

Books
The Undistorted Image: Staretz Silouan, 1866–1938, 1948, 1952. Faith Press, 1958 (ISBN B0007IXVB0).
The Monk of Mount Athos: Staretz Silouan 1866–1938, Mowbray, 1973. St. Vladimir's Seminary Press, 1997.
Wisdom from Mount Athos: The Writings of Staretz Siloan 1866–1938, St. Vladimir's Seminary Press, 1975.
His Life is Mine, St. Vladimir's Seminary Press, 1977 (ISBN B000B9E2WW). St. Vladimir's Seminary Press, 1997.
We Shall See Him As He Is, 1985. Essex, England: Stravropegic Monastery of St. John the Baptist, 1988.
Saint Silouan, the Athonite, St. Vladimir's Seminary Press; reprint edition, 1999.
On Prayer, St. Vladimir's Seminary Press, 1998.
The Cross of Loneliness: The Correspondence of Saint Sophrony and Archpriest Georges Florovsky St. Tikhon's Monastery Press, 2021.

Biographical
Christ, Our Way and Our Life by Archimandrite Zacharias. "A Presentation of the theology of Archimandrite Sophrony.".
I Love Therefore I Am by Nicholas V. Sakharov. St. Vladimir's Seminary Press, 2003.
I Know a Man in Christ: Elder Sophrony the Hesychast and Theologian by Hierotheos (Vlachos). Holy Monastery of the Birth of the Theotokos, 2015.

See also
 Theoria

References

Online sources

https://orthochristian.com/124899.html

External links

Interview with Archimandrite Hierotheos on Elder Sophrony, excerpt from Divine Ascent.

1896 births
1993 deaths
20th-century Christian mystics
Athonite Fathers
Eastern Orthodox mystics
Eastern Orthodox theologians
Russian Orthodox monks
Clergy from Moscow
Emigrants from the Russian Empire to France
Hesychasts
Eastern Orthodox writers
Emigrants from the Russian Empire to the United Kingdom
Emigrants from the Russian Empire to Greece
Archimandrites
20th-century Eastern Orthodox theologians
Palamism
People associated with St. Panteleimon Monastery
Starets
Moscow School of Painting, Sculpture and Architecture alumni